Cameron Hammond (born 20 September 1989 in Moree, New South Wales) is an Aboriginal professional boxer who represented Australia at the 2010 Commonwealth Games in New Delhi, India and 2012 Summer Olympics in the middleweight division.

Background
Hammond played rugby league from the age of nine before discovering a talent for boxing when he followed a friend to the Moree PCYC at the age of 14. Cameron was an all round sportsman in primary and high school days. At primary school level he competed in events such rugby league, union, touch football, 100m, cross country, 400m, swimming where he won aged championship and also aged champion for athletics. Cameron continued his love of sport into high school, as he was cross country champion for his age group, and swimming champion. He also competed in the local squash competition, where he was a winner in the (doubles) for the winter/summer competition. Also Cameron played rugby union in the U17's. Cameron has been into competitive sports since attending school and continues today.  He comes from a family of three boys, and is the middle child. His two brothers are Wayne (eldest) and Trent (youngest). His mother Vicki has raised the boys on her own. Cameron's grandparents, Yvonne and Ronald 'Spoto' Hammond, are his biggest supporters, along with mother and brothers and also Cameron's five aunts and uncles, and all his cousins.

Amateur career
He received a scholarship in 2007 to the Australian Institute of Sport through the National Indigenous Talent Development program.
Since receiving the scholarship, Cameron has not looked back. His goals were to represent Australia at the Commonwealth and Olympic games, he achieved both goals. He is recognized in the Australian Olympic Committee list of Australian Indigenous Olympians.

Pro career
After both the Commonwealth and Olympic games, his goal was to turn professional. Cameron has had several pro fights and 18/1 record and is one of Australia top prospects in the Welterweight division. After losing a unanimous decision to Kris George in 2016 for the Commonwealth welterweight title, Hammond took a year and a half hiatus from boxing only to come back in 2018 with TKO over Thai-born Australian Apichat Koedchatturat. He is trained by Glenn Rushton same trainer as Jeff Horn fellow Olympian and team mate.

Professional record

| style="text-align:center;" colspan="8"|17 wins (9 knockouts, 8 decision), 1 loss, 0 draws
|-  style="text-align:center; background:#e3e3e3;"
|  style="border-style:none none solid solid; "|Res.
|  style="border-style:none none solid solid; "|Record
|  style="border-style:none none solid solid; "|Opponent
|  style="border-style:none none solid solid; "|Type
|  style="border-style:none none solid solid; "|Round
|  style="border-style:none none solid solid; "|Date
|  style="border-style:none none solid solid; "|Location
|  style="border-style:none none solid solid; "|Notes
|- align=center
|Win
|18-01
|align=left|Frank Rojas
|UD
| 10 (10)
|
|align=left|Suncorp Stadium, Brisbane
|align=left|vacant World Boxing Association Oceania Welterweight Title 
|- align=center
|Win
|17-01
|align=left|Aphichat Koedchatturat
|TKO
| 2 (10)
|
|align=left|Pullman & Mercure, King George Square, Brisbane
|align=left|
|- align=center
|Loss
|16-1
|align=left|Kris George
|UD
| 12 (12)
|
|align=left|Rumours International, Toowoomba, Queensland, Australia
|align=left|vacant Commonwealth (British Empire) Welterweight Title
|- align=center
|Win
|16-0
|align=left|Devdarshan Singh
|UD
| 6 (6)
|
|align=left|Thyagaraj Stadium, New Delhi
|align=left|
|- align=center
|Win
|15-0
|align=left|Sahlan Coral
|UD
| 6 (6)
|
|align=left|Convention & Exhibition Centre, Melbourne
|align=left|
|- align=center
|Win
|14-0
|align=left|unknown
|KO
| 7 (8)
|
|align=left|Alexandria Basketball Stadium, Perry Park, Australia
|align=left|
|- align=center
|Win
|13-0
|align=left|Sedat Tasci
|TKO
| 4 (10)
|
|align=left|The Sands Tavern, Maroochydore, Queensland, Australia
|align=left|WBA Oceania welterweight title 
|- align=center
|Win
|12-0
|align=left|Jese Ravudi
|TKO
| 5 (10)
|
|align=left|Crossing Theatre, Narrabri, New South Wales, Australia
|align=left|WBA Oceania welterweight title 
|- align=center
|Win
|11-0
|align=left|Romeo Jakosalem
|TKO
| 9 (10)
|
|align=left|Sleeman Sports Complex - Theatre, Chandler, Queensland, Australia
|align=left|vacant WBC Eurasia Pacific Boxing Council welterweight title & WBA Oceania welterweight title
|- align=center
|Win
|10-0
|align=left|Alfredo Rodolfo Blanco
|UD
| 10 (10)
|
|align=left|Town Hall, Moree, New South Wales, Australia
|align=left|vacant WBA Oceania welterweight title
|- align=center
|Win
|9-0
|align=left|Pramool Boonpok
|UD
| 6 (6)
|
|align=left|Entertainment Centre, Newcastle, New South Wales, Australia
|align=left|
|- align=center
|Win
|8-0
|align=left|Michael Correa
|RTD
| 4 (6)
|
|align=left|Mansfield Tavern, Mansfield, Queensland, Australia
|align=left|
|- align=center
|Win
|7-0
|align=left|Pramool Boonpok
|UD
| 4 (4)
|
|align=left|Brisbane Entertainment Centre, Boondall, Queensland, Australia
|align=left|
|- align=center
|Win
|6-0
|align=left|Dennapa Bigshotcamp
|UD
| 6 (6)
|
|align=left|The Melbourne Pavilion, Flemington, Victoria, Australia
|align=left|
|- align=center
|Win
|5-0
|align=left|Joel Dela Cruz
|UD
| 8 (8)
|
|align=left|Royal International Convention Centre, Brisbane, Queensland, Australia
|align=left|
|- align=center
|Win
|4-0
|align=left|Jody Allen
|TKO
| 4 (6)
|
|align=left|RSL Club, Dubbo, New South Wales, Australia
|align=left|
|- align=center
|Win
|3-0
|align=left|Kane Buckley
|TKO
| 6 (6)
|
|align=left|Town Hall, Moree, New South Wales, Australia
|align=left|
|- align=center
|Win
|2-0
|align=left|Daniel Roy Maxwell
|UD
| 6 (6)
|
|align=left|Royal International Convention Centre, Brisbane, Queensland, Australia
|align=left|
|- align=center
|Win
|1-0
|align=left|Zhi Xiang Jiang
|TKO
| 2 (6)
|
|align=left|Convention Towers and Exhibition Center, Hong Kong S.A.R., China
|align=left|
|- align=center
|}

References

External links

1989 births
Living people
Indigenous Australian boxers
Australian Institute of Sport boxers
Indigenous Australian Olympians
Boxers at the 2012 Summer Olympics
Olympic boxers of Australia
Australian male boxers
Gamilaraay
Welterweight boxers
Boxers at the 2010 Commonwealth Games
Commonwealth Games competitors for Australia
People from Moree, New South Wales
Sportsmen from New South Wales